The Werthyr standing stone is a standing stone located to the west of Amlwch, Anglesey, Wales.

History
The stone is thought to date back to the Bronze Age. Early writing suggests that there was a second upright stone and a long capstone, both of which have since disappeared.

References

Scheduled monuments in Anglesey
Amlwch